The Monastery of Komnenion is an Eastern Orthodox monastery located near Stomio, Larissa, Greece.

According to tradition it was founded in the time of Justinian I, but was rebuilt in its present form by Byzantine emperor Alexios I Komnenos.

The modern main church (katholikon) dates largely to the 16th century, with some parts from a 14th-century structure. The outer walls are decorated with large numbers of ancient and Byzantine spolia, but the surviving interior frescoes date to 1758. Modern archaeological excavations have discovered traces of the Komnenian-era katholikon underneath.

The monastery was destroyed by fire in 1868 and the katholikon was left ruined for over a century after; it was restored in the early 2000s by the 7th Ephorate of Byzantine Antiquities with European Union funds. The modern Monastery of the Dormition of the Theotokos and of Saint Demetrios has been erected around the old structure.

References

Komnenion
Buildings and structures in Larissa (regional unit)
12th-century architecture in Greece
Byzantine church buildings in Greece
Alexios I Komnenos
16th-century architecture in Greece